Biliran's at-large congressional district is the sole congressional district of the Philippines in the province of Biliran. It was created ahead of the 1995 Philippine House of Representatives elections following its conversion into a regular province under the 1991 Local Government Code (Republic Act No. 7160) which was ratified in a 1992 plebiscite concurrent with that year's general election. Biliran had been a sub-province of Leyte since 1959 and was last represented as part of Leyte's 3rd district in the House of Representatives from 1987 to 1995 and earlier from 1961 to 1972, the multi-member Region VIII's at-large district in the Interim Batasang Pambansa from 1978 to 1984, and the multi-member Leyte's at-large district in the Regular Batasang Pambansa from 1984 to 1986. It is currently represented in the 18th Congress by Gerardo Espina Jr. of the PDP–Laban, later Lakas–CMD.

Representation history

Election results

2022

2019

2016

2013

2010

See also
Legislative districts of Biliran

References

Congressional districts of the Philippines
Politics of Biliran
1991 establishments in the Philippines
At-large congressional districts of the Philippines
Congressional districts of Eastern Visayas
Constituencies established in 1991